William Knoedelseder (born 1947) is an American author, former Los Angeles Times business writer, television producer and news executive.

Early life and education
Knoedelseder, who is from St. Louis, Missouri, graduated with a bachelor of arts in English literature from the University of Missouri-St. Louis.

Career
Knoedelseder was a reporter from 1977 to 1989 for the Los Angeles Times. He also produced news for Knight Ridder, Fox and the USA Network.

His articles in the 1980s into corrupt practices in the record business formed the basis for his book Stiffed: A True Story of MCA, the Music Business and the Mafia.

In 2012, his book Bitter Brew, which spans five generations of the Busch family and the foreign takeover of Anheuser-Busch, made New York Times Bestseller list. It revealed new information about August Busch IV. In 2019, CBS Television Studios acquired the option to make it into a cable TV series produced by Jeffrey Kramer.

Knoedelseder executive produced two television documentaries – Something's Got to Give, a 1990 two-hour special for Fox about Marilyn Monroe, and All the Presidents’ Movies, a three-hour 2003 special for Bravo that described the viewing habits of modern U.S. presidents.

Knoedelseder worked as a television producer and executive creating news programs and documentaries for Fox, Disney, Knight-Ridder, Bravo and USA Broadcasting. As vice president of news at USA, he oversaw the launch of a nightly news program on WAMI-TV in Miami titled "The Times." Miami New Times named it "Best Newscast in South Florida.”

Books
Fins: Harley Earl, the Rise of General Motors, and the Glory Days of Detroit (2018), 
Bitter Brew: The Rise and Fall of Anheuser-Busch and America's Kings of Beer (2012), 
I'm Dying Up Here: Heartbreak and High Times in Standup Comedy's Golden Age (2010), 
In Eddie's Name: One Family's Triumph over Tragedy (with co-author Bryn Freedman) (1999), 
Stiffed: A True Story of MCA, the Music Business and the Mafia (1993),

References

External links
Official website

New York Times Filmography

American business writers
American television journalists
Journalists from Missouri
Living people
Writers from St. Louis
Television producers from California
Writers from Los Angeles
1947 births
American male journalists